Yegor Tadeushevich Khatkevich (born 9 July 1988) is a Belarusian professional footballer who plays for Atyrau.

International career
Khatkevich earned his first cap for the national team of his country on 26 February 2020, keeping a clean sheet in the 1:0 away win over Bulgaria in a friendly match.

Honours
MTZ-RIPO Minsk
Belarusian Cup winner: 2007–08

Torpedo-BelAZ Zhodino
Belarusian Cup winner: 2015–16

References

External links

1988 births
Living people
Belarusian footballers
Belarus international footballers
Belarusian expatriate footballers
Expatriate footballers in Sweden
Expatriate footballers in Kazakhstan
Association football goalkeepers
FC BATE Borisov players
FC Partizan Minsk players
FC Lida players
FC Vitebsk players
FC Rechitsa-2014 players
FC Gomel players
FC Naftan Novopolotsk players
FC Torpedo-BelAZ Zhodino players
FC Isloch Minsk Raion players
FC Dinamo Minsk players
FC Atyrau players